Moby Doll's impact in scientific research was enormous and in a sense unrepeatable. He was the first ever killer whale (orca) to be studied at close quarters alive, initiating pioneering research about his very misunderstood species. Few other individual animals have ever changed the way their species was perceived more than Moby Doll.

Up to 1964, "whale research was done postmortem," said Center for Whale Research founder Ken Balcomb, and the main discoveries were the remains of what whales had eaten, in their stomachs. The Marine Mammal Biological Laboratory in Seattle was hunting and killing orcas for its research.

Sounds
Killer whale sounds had been recorded five times in the years 1956-1961, but their production had never been scientifically studied before Moby Doll's captivity.

First recordings, 17 July 1964
Using hydrophones, scientists began recording the whale's vocalizations immediately he was brought to Vancouver, British Columbia. He talked "almost non-stop"—unsurprisingly for his type of killer whale (Southern Resident). Scientists found that in the busy port "at the sound of approaching vessels the voice registers signs of panic, but this dies away as the vessel moves on." The day after arriving at Burrard Dry Dock, the juvenile orca made pulsed long-distance calls answered by a killer whale two miles away. "The captive became very excited and sent out louder, rapid chatter sound when it heard the calls from outside," said UBC researcher Harold Fisher.

A tape of Moby Doll kept by Fisher would years later have great significance for the pivotal orca scientist John Ford (see below).

Schevill and Watkins
Schevill and Watkins' pioneering study of Moby Doll created the fundamental basis for understanding killer whale sounds.

William E. Schevill (1906-1994) was a paleontologist who first heard the underwater sounds of whales while working for the US Navy during World War II, in the fight against U-boats. He was inspired to become a cetologist and leading pioneer in the study of whale sounds, working at the Woods Hole Oceanographic Institution. The killer whale Moby Doll represented the 21st species of cetacean that he studied.

In August 1964, he traveled from Woods Hole to Vancouver with his associate William A. Watkins to study Moby Doll for two days. They carried with them a hydrophone and their portable custom "Rowboat Recorder".

Moby Doll's seapen at Jericho Beach proved to be an exceptionally good, quiet site for the scientists' study. They did not have to deal with noisy pumps and noisy echoes coming from the walls of a tank, as in some previous studies of cetaceans, and the location had very little traffic of any kind, especially at night, when Moby Doll was most vocal and they did their most crucial work.

Echolocation clicks
Part of Schevill's research involved discoveries about animal echolocation. Following Donald Griffin's pioneering work with bats, Schevill was the first to describe echolocation in whales, in his 1956 paper, "Evidence of echolocation in cetaceans."

In captivity, Moby Doll did not produce echolocation clicks in daylight. In the dark, when he could not rely on eyesight, the scientists manipulated the hydrophone as an obstacle in the water to test the killer whale. They found that he, without exceptions, would crash into it if he wasn't producing clicks in the moment; and avoid it when he was producing clicks at that time, or when it was in a spot that was not new. Through this experiment, Moby Doll was the first to give proof of the use of echolocation by killer whales.

Furthermore, by comparing Moby Doll's orientation with the sound characteristics of the click recordings, the scientists demonstrated the sharp, directional nature of his echolocation, giving support to Kenneth Norris's new hypothesis that the fatty melon of a delphinid might function as an acoustic lens.

Compared to those recorded of other delphinids, the killer whale's clicks were characteristically produced at a slower rate: either at a steady 2 to 6 per second, or in short, slow bursts separated by a few seconds. The bursts were of 10-15 clicks, starting at a rate of 18 per second, and slowing to 6 per second, with the fundamental (resonant) frequency falling from 500 cps to 350 cps.

The duration of a click was between 10 and 25 milliseconds. These clicks were narrower-band and lower-frequency than those of other delphinids.

Calls
Schevill and Watkins divided Moby Doll's sounds into two types. Apart from echolocation clicks, they labelled the other type as "screams", which was how they characterized the pulsed sounds they analyzed. Moby Doll never produced the "whistle-like squeal" of other delphinids. Rather, these "screams" were produced in the same way as echolocation, but in pulses of clicks at a much faster repetition-rate, with the strong harmonic structure masking the individuality of the clicks. Indeed, some pulses developed out of slow clicking that accelerated into a "scream", and some "screams" decelerated into slow clicking. Moreover, whereas other dolphins could produce clicks and whistles concurrently, Moby Doll never produced clicks and "screams" simultaneously, which was supporting evidence that both of his types of sound were produced by the same mechanism. (In later research, however, John Ford did detect some whistling to be a minor component of southern resident killer whale vocalizations, "whereas whistles are the primary social vocalization among the majority of Delphinidae species.")

The scientists noted that there was much variation in their recordings, but certain patterns were general. The pulses had a "strident" quality due to their harmonic structure, with many strong harmonics, and they were much louder than the echolocation. The whale often hit two preferred notes, one at 500 cps, the other at 2,000 cps; a call often consisted of sliding shifts between these two frequencies. "The subtleties of beginnings and endings of screams could be lost quickly at a distance because of their relatively low amplitude."

The duration of the pulses was 0.1 to 3.0 seconds, with 0.65 as an average. Moby Doll called in bouts of 3-5 minutes. Beginning with about one second of separation between calls, he gradually lengthened the separation to a period of quiet of 15 to 30 seconds between calls, as if listening.

"When our captive screamed, it was apparently trying to communicate (stimulated by outside disturbance, usually a passing boat)." In their short stay in Vancouver from August 16 to 18, Schevill and Watkins did not record the presence of any other killer whales in the vicinity, but there were exchanges of calls with other killer whales reported at other times, notably when he first arrived in Vancouver.

John Ford and dialects
As a nine-year-old boy, John Ford had seen Moby Doll at Burrard Dry Dock during his one day on display. Later, he worked for the Vancouver Aquarium. He studied whale sounds when he was an undergrad.

At UBC, he heard Professor H.D. Fisher's tape of Moby Doll, and "was really struck at the sounds that were so strident and harsh and metallic in quality. They really are unusual sounds and a little bit sad in a way," he recalled recently.

In 1978, as Ford was beginning his description of killer whale dialects, he made his first recording of the southern resident orcas. One call was the one he remembered from Fisher's tape. Through it, he was able to identify that J Pod had been Moby Doll's pod, which passed this pod-specific call from generation to generation. Moreover, this was evidence that these orcas had an animal culture, because their calls were learnt.

Sleep
The fact that Moby Doll never rested surprised the Vancouver Aquarium's director Dr. Murray Newman, and Dr. Patrick McGeer. "In contrast to this, the whales in Johnstone Strait were seen occasionally resting at the surface for brief periods." Moby Doll just kept swimming around his pen, always in a counterclockwise direction, and the guards that were posted never saw him stop. "The low salinity and concomitant low buoyancy at the enclosure may have necessitated constant movement."

Regardless, the scientists "strongly suspected from this that killer whales do not experience deep sleep."

Hydration
Analysis of the urine did not find high sodium and potassium values, building evidence for "the notion that whales obtain their water from food and metabolism and do not drink seawater."

Necropsy

Brain
Subsequent to Moby Doll's necropsy, Dr. Murray Newman and Dr. Patrick McGeer wrote, "The most striking organ was the brain. It weighed 6450 g., a remarkable size for the animal." (A human brain weighs 1350 grams on average.)

McGeer was excited by this brain. It gave evidence of "what researchers have long suspected—killer whales depend more on sound and balance for navigating than they do on sight." He said, "It was a huge auditory nerve and a very large cortex. The optic nerve," he said, "was smaller than the auditory nerve, just the reverse of humans who depend more on sight than on other senses." The juvenile orca's brain amazed Dr. Paul Spong when it was given to him in 1969. "It presented a higher density of convolutions" than a human brain—"a feature often used to distinguish human intelligence."

Skin lesions
After a month at Jericho, Moby Doll's skin developed lesions which soon spread all over his body. Lab tests on scrapings established that they were due to a fungus. This fungus would not grow in the salinity of ocean water, but Moby Doll's seapen was in water with the low salinity of the Fraser River delta. Though copper sulfate was applied daily to his body, the lesions continued "to advance with extreme rapidity in the week prior to death." The dermatologist at the necropsy "said the fungus condition was superficial and could not cause death."

Harpoon wound
Moby Doll's harpoon wound had healed on the surface. Internally it had "produced a chip fracture of the occipital bone. The chip was about 5 cm. in diameter, involving only the external table."

"There were two very tiny necrotic patches on the occipital surface of the cortex, possibly reflecting a minor degree of damage incurred at the time of the chip fracture of the skull."

Infections
"Macroscopic section of the lungs showed a heavy collection of inflammatory cells, mainly polymorphonuclear leukocytes with numerous macrophages surrounding the nodules. In some areas definite branching mycelia, which were budding, could be seen." Cultures from the lung grew Aspergillus, Staphylococcus and Proteus. Lymph nodes in the neck were similarly infected, and "each kidney contained a mycotic abscess." "The pathological findings would seem to indicate death from a widespread mycotic infection with a superimposed terminal bacterial infection." There were other obvious contributing factors. In particular, Moby Doll's "extended fast depleted body reserves."
 for press coverage and interviews

Measurements
Length 467 cm. Height of dorsal fin 57 cm. Width of (pectoral) flipper 40 cm. Length of flipper 66 cm. Width of flukes 53 cm. Length of flukes 127 cm. No. of teeth 44, evenly distributed. Liver 45 kg.

"Examination of the skeleton revealed that the animal was very young."

References

General references

External links
Early recordings of orcas, and those of Moby Doll, can be found online in the Woods Hole Oceanographic Institution's "Watkins Marine Mammal Sound Database." Additional sound cuts of Moby Doll dated 17 July 1964 can be found there on an "All Cuts" page.

Individual orcas
Southern resident orcas
Orca researchers
Animal communication
Whale sounds
Oceanic dolphins
Animals that use echolocation
Cetology
Cetacean anatomy
Woods Hole Oceanographic Institution